Natural-rights libertarianism, also known as deontological liberalism, deontological libertarianism, libertarian moralism, natural rights-based libertarianism, philosophical libertarianism or rights-theorist libertarianism, is the theory that all individuals possess certain natural or moral rights, mainly a right of individual sovereignty and that therefore acts of initiation of force and fraud are rights-violations and that is sufficient reason to oppose those acts. This is one of the two ethical view points within right-libertarianism, the other being consequentialist libertarianism which only takes into account the consequences of actions and rules when judging them and holds that free markets and strong private property rights have good consequences.

Some deontological libertarian views are based on the non-aggression principle which states that no human being holds the right to initiate force or fraud against the person or property of another human being under any circumstances. This principle is taken as basic, defining all other moral principles, not simply principles of justice. Others are based on self-ownership, and concerned only with principles of justice.

Deontological libertarian philosophies 
Some deontological libertarians such as Ayn Rand advocate a minimal government to protect individuals from any violation of their rights and to prosecute those who initiate force against others. Others such as Murray Rothbard advocate the abolition of the state as they see the state as being an institutionalized initiation of force due to taxation. Their view of natural rights is derived, directly or indirectly, from the writings of St. Thomas Aquinas and John Locke. Hans-Hermann Hoppe advocates the abolition of the state on the basis of argumentation ethics.

Political parties 
Deontological libertarianism is the form of libertarianism officially supported by the Libertarian Party in the United States. In order to become a card-carrying member, one must sign an oath opposing the initiation of force to achieve political or social goals.

Criticisms and responses 
Some libertarians argue that a relaxation of the non-aggression principle can bring the greatest liberty to the greatest number. Murray Rothbard responded to this criticism by asserting that the means ought never to contradict the ends. Consequentialist libertarians ask "What authoritative force endowed me, and every other human being alive, with the right and responsibility of self-ownership? How does one prove, substantiate, or justify its existence?", at which Rothbard responded by appealing to a process of elimination which concluded in his asserting that self-ownership is the only defensible ethical position.

Philosopher Jonathan Wolff criticizes deontological libertarianism as incoherent, writing that it is incapable of explaining why harm suffered by the losers in economic competition does not violate the principle of self-ownership and that its advocates must "dishonestly smuggle" consequentialist arguments into their reasoning to justify the institution of the free market.

See also 

 Austrian School
 Classical liberalism
 Consequentialist libertarianism
 Debates within libertarianism
 Geolibertarianism
 Minarchism
 Natural and legal rights
 Non-aggression principle
 Objectivism and libertarianism
 Outline of libertarianism
 Political ethics
 Self-ownership
 Voluntaryism

References

Further reading
 
 

Deontological ethics
Libertarianism by form
Libertarian theory